Sympistis modesta is a species of moth in the family Noctuidae (the owlet moths).

The MONA or Hodges number for Sympistis modesta is 10090.

References

Further reading

 
 
 

modesta
Articles created by Qbugbot
Moths described in 1933